The Korbong are one of the sub-tribes of Halam community of Tripura, India.

As of 2016, there are a total of 31 families with 122 people in the subtribe. The model village of Korbongpara, whose foundation was laid in 2016, is intended for the Korbong community.

Variant spellings of the name include Korbong, Korbang, Karbang, Karbong, Korbwng.

See also 
 Debbarma
 Jamatia

References 

Scheduled Tribes of India
Ethnic groups in Tripura
West Tripura district
Khowai district